Today's Tragedy, Tomorrow's Memory: The Mixtape is the second official mixtape from South African rapper A-Reece. It was released on March 26, 2021. This mixtape features guest appearances Ayanda Jiya, Stogie T, Wordz, Jay Jody and Belo Salo.

Background 
On February 2, 2020, Reece performed unreleased songs, including "The 5 Year Plan", during his show at Riky Rick's Cotton Fest music festival. Reece told Flaunt magazine that he was inspired by Kanye West.

Awards and nominations

Track listing 

Note: All songs are stylized in all caps, and with the symbol "$" replacing the letter "S" in the title. For example, "The Same Thing" is stylized as "THE $AME THING"

References 

A-Reece albums
2021 mixtape albums